Kopervik Church is a parish church of the Church of Norway in Karmøy Municipality in Rogaland county, Norway. It is located in the town of Kopervik on the eastern shore of the island of Karmøy. It is the church for the Kopervik parish which is part of the Karmøy prosti (deanery) in the Diocese of Stavanger. The glass and concrete church was built in a rectangular design in 2017 using designs by the architectural firm: Arkitektgruppen Lille Frøen AS. The church seats about 500 people.

History
The people of the Kopervik area historically went to church at Avaldsnes Church, but as the area gained population, a desire for a church in Kopervik grew. In 1855, the community received permission to build a church. The original Kopervik Church was built in 1861 by the architect Jacob Wilhelm Nordan. That church was consecrated on 2 October 1861. The church was built in a cruciform design built in an Italian renaissance style. It seated about 350 people and it was situated in a prominent place in the town of Kopervik, clearly visible from the sea. The wooden church burned down on 28 May 2010 during an accident during a renovation that was in preparation for the buildings 150-year anniversary (to be held in 2011).

Shortly after the fire, planning began to replace the church. The new church was completed in 2017. The new church was consecrated on 23 April 2017 by the Bishop Ivar Braut. The new, modern church has three sections: the main sanctuary, an office area, and a church hall.

Media gallery

See also
List of churches in Rogaland

References

Karmøy
Churches in Rogaland
21st-century Church of Norway church buildings
Churches completed in 2017
1861 establishments in Norway